Peter Filatreu Cross (October 6, 1815 – October 13, 1862) was an assistant engraver to James B. Longacre at the U.S. Mint in Philadelphia, Pennsylvania.

Early life
Cross was born in New York City to William Cross (a ship captain, missing at sea September 1815) and Hannah Woods Cross, and despite Mint records stating that he died in 1856, he appears in the 1860 U.S. Census in Philadelphia.  He married Harriet Chapin and had one child, Maria B. Cross (later Willard, 1845–1917).

Career
He is best known for his work on the reverse of the 1849 one dollar ($1) gold coin. The value of gold required the coin to be so small —  in diameter) — that too many people were losing them, so it had to be redesigned (In spending power, the dollar of 1849 is equal to $ today, but even that value is far exceeded by the collector value as well as by the present value of the gold content).  He also designed medals of the period, including a medal of Commander Duncan Ingraham.

Death
Cross died on October 13, 1862 in Philadelphia, Pennsylvania, and is buried at Lawnview Cemetery in Rockledge, Pennsylvania. He was disinterred from the Odd Fellows Cemetery in Philadelphia circa 1951 when that cemetery was removed to make way for the Raymond Rosen housing project, which itself was demolished in 1995 as part of an urban renewal program.

On March 14, 2013, Cross was mentioned by full name in the Jump Start comic strip, written by Robb Armstrong, a native of Philadelphia, in an arc about coin collecting.

References

American engravers
1815 births
1862 deaths
Artists from New York City
Burials at Lawnview Memorial Park